The Islands Trust is a federation of local governments on the islands in the Strait of Georgia, Howe Sound and Haro Strait in British Columbia.  It was established by, and is operated under, the Islands Trust Act, enacted by the Government of British Columbia in 1974. The goal of the Islands Trust is to "preserve and protect the Trust Area and its unique amenities and environment for the benefit of the residents of the Trust Area and of British Columbia". The conservation arm, Islands Trust Conservancy, works to preserve and protect landscapes across the Trust Area. Through conservation covenants and nature reserves, the Conservancy protects over 110 properties totaling 1,375 hectares.

The Islands Trust is subdivided into various local trust committees that are responsible for land use planning and regulation for their respective islands and any minor islands surrounding them. The municipality of Bowen Island is also within the jurisdiction of the Islands Trust.  Gambier Island Local Trust Committee does land use planning as well for Keats Island and for North Thormanby Island and South Thormanby Island.

Local Trust Committees
Ballenas-Winchelsea Islands
Denman Island
Gabriola Island
Galiano Island
Gambier Island
Hornby Island
Lasqueti Island
Mayne Island
North Pender Island
James Island
Salt Spring Island
South Pender Island
Thetis Island

References

External links
 Islands Trust
 Extent of Islands Trust area on OpenStreetMap

Organizations based in British Columbia
Strait of Georgia